Merycopotamus is an extinct genus of Asian anthracothere that appeared during the Middle Miocene, and died out in the Late Pliocene.  At the height of the genus' influence, species ranged throughout southern Asia.  With the extinction of the last species, M. dissimilis, the lineage of anthracotheres came to an end.  Merycopotamus was closely related to the anthracothere genus Libycosaurus, which, unlike the former,  never left Africa. In fact, some African fossils originally placed in Merycopotamus, but are now referred to Libycosaurus.

References

Anthracotheres
Miocene even-toed ungulates
Pliocene even-toed ungulates
Piacenzian extinctions
Neogene mammals of Asia
Fossil taxa described in 1847
Prehistoric even-toed ungulate genera